James Duff (born 1961) is an American billionaire businessman. Together with his brother Thomas Duff, he is the founder and co-owner of Duff Capital Investors, a holding company with annual turnover in excess of $2.6 billion. In 1983, the brothers inherited Southern Tire Mart from their father, Ernest Duff.

He is married, with two children, and lives in Hattiesburg, Mississippi. They are members of the Church of Jesus Christ of Latter-day Saints.

References

Living people
1960s births
People from Hattiesburg, Mississippi
Businesspeople from Mississippi
American company founders
American billionaires
American Latter Day Saints
Latter Day Saints from Mississippi